Zimbabwe competed at the 1984 Summer Olympics in Los Angeles, United States. This was the fifth time that Zimbabwe had competed at an Olympic Games with the first three as Rhodesia. 15 competitors, 12 men and 3 women, took part in 18 events in 5 sports.

Background
Zimbabwe first competed at the 1928 games in Amsterdam, Netherlands as Rhodesia. Before the 1984 edition, they had participated in four Summer Olympics before this edition. They were meant to enter the 1972 Olympics in Munich but the invitation was removed by the IOC after the African countries threaten to boycott the games. Zimbabwe would send 15 competitors to the 1984 games with the most being the sport of Athletics with 6 athletes coming from that sport. Zephaniah Ncube who competed in the Athletics was the flag bearer for Zimbabwe at the 1984 Olympics.

Athletics

Men's 200 metres
 Christopher Madzokere
 Heat – 22.75 (did not advance)

Men's 400 metres
 Christopher Madzokere
 Heat – 48.49 (did not advance)

Men's 800 metres
 Tapfumaneyi Jonga
 Heat – 1:49.59 (did not advance)

Men's 1,500 metres
 Tapfumaneyi Jonga
 Heat – 3:40.42 (advance to semi final)
 Semi final – 3:41.80 (Rank 11 did not advance)

Men's 5,000 metres
 Zephaniah Ncube
 Heat – 13:46.33
 Semifinals – 13:53.25 (did not advance)

Men's 10,000 metres
 Zephaniah Ncube
 Qualifying Heat – 28:28.53 
 Final – 28:31.61 (11th place)

Men's Marathon
 Patrick Nyambarito – 2:37:18 (67th place)
 Tommy Lazarus – did not finish (no ranking)

Women's Discus Throw 
 Mariette Van Heerden 
 Qualification – 50.54 m (did not advance)

Boxing

Zimbabwe was represented by three athletes in the boxing at the 1984 Olympics, each of them competing in their first Olympics. 25 year old boxer, Ndaba Dube competed in the bantamweight division. He won his opening match on 2 August against fellow African Amon Neequaye. The round of 16 match was held three days later with Louis Gomis being his opponent. He would win in a clean sweep before going on to lose in the quarter finals three days later against Mexican boxer Héctor López. The other two boxers had first up loses. Ambrose Mlilo competed in the light middleweight division, where he would lose in the opening round of the competition to Manfred Zielonka from West Germany while in the middleweight division, Arigoma Chiponda lost to Tom Corr from Ireland in a clean sweep.

Diving

Women

Sailing

Mixed One Person Dinghy
 Guy Grossmith
Rank 23

Shooting

Men's Air Rifle (10 metres)
 Dennis Hardman
Rank 49  Points: 548, (90,90,92,92,95,89)

Men's Small–Bore Rifle Three Positions (50 metres)
 Dennis Hardman
Rank 43  Points: 1101, Standing 340 (83,86,82,89), Kneeling 371 (91,91,96,93), Prone 390 (98,97,98,97)

Men's Small-Bore Rifle Prone (50 metres)
 Dennis Hardman
Rank 67  Points: 569 (94,95,93,94,95,98)

Mixed Trap
 Clive Conolly
Rank 22 Points: 181

Mixed Skeet
 Bob Warren-Codrington
Rank 62 Points: 167

References 

Nations at the 1984 Summer Olympics
1984
1984 in Zimbabwean sport